The 1995 Dynasty Cup was a football competition for the top four teams of East Asia. The third edition of the Dynasty Cup was held from 19 to 26 February 1995 in British Hong Kong which was under control of United Kingdom. The competition was won by Japan for the second straight time.

Participating teams

 Hong Kong

Venues

Results

Group stage

Finals stage

Third place match

Final

Awards

External links
1995 Dynasty Cup at Rsssf

1995
1995 in Asian football
1994–95 in Hong Kong football
1995 in Chinese football
1995 in Japanese football
1995 in South Korean football
1995